In Greek mythology, Chrysogeneia or Chrysogenia (Ancient Greek: Χρυσογένεια) may refer to the two different individuals:

 Chrysogenia, daughter of the river-god Peneus, and thus can be considered a naiad. She was the mother of Thissaeus by Zeus.
 Chrysogeneia, a Minyan princess as the daughter of King Almus of Orchomenus. She was the sister of Chryse and mother, by the sea-god Poseidon, of Chryses, father of the eponym Minyas. In some myths, Minyas himself was the son of Chrysogone and Poseidon. Her name which can denote “golden” expresses the traditional opinion of the Orchomenians' wealth.

Notes

References 

 Pausanias, Description of Greece with an English Translation by W.H.S. Jones, Litt.D., and H.A. Ormerod, M.A., in 4 Volumes. Cambridge, MA, Harvard University Press; London, William Heinemann Ltd. 1918. . Online version at the Perseus Digital Library
 Pausanias, Graeciae Descriptio. 3 vols. Leipzig, Teubner. 1903.  Greek text available at the Perseus Digital Library.
Pseudo-Clement, Recognitions from Ante-Nicene Library Volume 8, translated by Smith, Rev. Thomas. T. & T. Clark, Edinburgh. 1867. Online version at theio.com

Divine women of Zeus
Women of Poseidon
Women in Greek mythology
Minyan characters in Greek mythology